"Voodoo Child (Slight Return)" is a song recorded by the Jimi Hendrix Experience in 1968 that appears as the final track on the Electric Ladyland album released that year.  It contains improvised guitar and a vocal from Jimi Hendrix, backed by Noel Redding on bass and Mitch Mitchell on drums. The song is one of Hendrix's best known; it was a feature of his concert performances throughout his career, and several live renditions were recorded and released on later albums.

After his death in 1970, Track Records released the song as a single in the United Kingdom using the title "Voodoo Chile" (see confusion over title). It became Hendrix's only number one single on the UK Singles Chart, reaching the top position during the week of November 15, 1970.  Several artists have performed or recorded versions of the song. Rolling Stone magazine included it at number 101 on their original 2004 list of the "500 Greatest Songs of All Time"

Origins and recording
"Voodoo Child (Slight Return)" was developed from "Voodoo Chile", recorded May 2, 1968, during a studio jam with Steve Winwood on organ and Jack Casady on bass. The next day, Hendrix returned to the studio with Redding and Mitchell for the filming of a short documentary by  ABC television.  Noel Redding explained, "We learned that song in the studio ... They had the cameras rolling on us as we played it". Hendrix added,

According to Hendrix biographer Steven Roby, eight takes of the song were recorded by Hendrix, Redding, and Mitchell, and the final one was chosen as the master, which appeared on Electric Ladyland.

Lyrics and interpretation
Author Charles Shaar Murray examines Hendrix's use of the term "Voodoo Child" in his book Crosstown Traffic:

Except for the chorus, the lyrics of "Voodoo Child (Slight Return)" are different from "Voodoo Chile":

During a January 1, 1970, performance with the Band of Gypsys, Hendrix introduces the song as the "Black Panthers' national anthem" (included on the album Live at the Fillmore East).  At the time, he was being pressured to make a statement about racial issues in the U.S.

Live recordings
"Voodoo Child (Slight Return)" became a staple of Hendrix's concert performances, varying in length from seven to eighteen minutes. Recordings from the Winterland Ballroom, Royal Albert Hall, Woodstock, and the Fillmore East were later released on The Jimi Hendrix Concerts, Hendrix in the West, Woodstock, and Live at the Fillmore East.  Many more recordings have also been issued (see List of songs recorded by Jimi Hendrix § Voodoo Child (Slight Return)).

Critical reception and recognition

An AllMusic reviewer described the song as "a perfect example of how Hendrix took the Delta blues form and not only psychedelicized it, but cast an even more powerful spell by delivering the lyric in the voice of a voodoo priest".  Also noted is Hendrix's guitar work: "Opening with a simple riff on the wah-wah pedal, the song explodes into full sonic force, the guitarist hitting the crunching chords and taking the astral-inspired leads for which he became infamous. The real guitar explorations happen midway through the song, while the basic, thundering riff is unrelenting".

Joe Satriani said of the song: "It's just the greatest piece of electric guitar work ever recorded. In fact, the whole song could be considered the holy grail of guitar expression and technique. It is a beacon of humanity." Rolling Stone magazine included the song at number 102 on their list of the 500 Greatest Songs of All Time. A variety of musicians have recorded "Voodoo Child (Slight Return)", sometimes as "Voodoo Chile (Slight Return)" or shortened to "Voodoo Child".

Charts

Stevie Ray Vaughan rendition
Stevie Ray Vaughan recorded "Voodoo Child (Slight Return)" for his second album, Couldn't Stand the Weather (1984). He explained in a 1985 interview: "I love Hendrix’s music... and I just feel it's important for people to hear him."  Although he follows Hendrix's original, "he still manages to make it his own", according to Far Out magazine contributor Sam Kemp. Guitar Worlds Damian Fanelli adds "His [Vaughan's] uncanny ability to smooth out some of Hendrix’s weirder edges without losing any of the music’s power or excitement allowed him to credibly deliver Jimi’s avant-garde blues to a whole new generation of guitar fanatics." Vaughan often performed the song in concert and live versions are included on the albums Live Alive (1986) and Live at Montreux 1982 & 1985 (2001).

Uses in popular culture
Wrestler Hulk Hogan used a portion of the song as his theme music during his time as leader of the heel faction group, the New World Order (NWO) while wrestling in WCW, and then during his comeback run in WWE (previously the World Wrestling Federation). According to a 2020 interview with wrestling impresario Eric Bischoff, he acquired a license for Hogan to use the song from Hendrix's stepsister and manager of his recording legacy, Janie Hendrix.  Bischoff claimed that the agreement allowed him to use up to three minutes of the song in various contexts in 1997 for $100,000: "People thought I was insane, [they] thought I was burning Ted Turner's money [in 1997, but] if someone were to try to cut that deal right now [in 2020] it'd be in the millions".

See also
List of UK Singles Chart number ones of the 1970s
Stevie Ray Vaughan

Notes

References

External links
 
 
 

The Jimi Hendrix Experience songs
1968 songs
1970 singles
UK Singles Chart number-one singles
Songs written by Jimi Hendrix
Track Records singles
Polydor Records singles
Song recordings produced by Chas Chandler